Myriaporidae is a family of bryozoans belonging to the order Cheilostomatida.

Genera:
 Leieschara M.Sars, 1863
 Myriapora de Blainville, 1830
 Myriozoella Levinsen, 1909
 Myriozoum Donati, 1750

References

Cheilostomatida